Biochemia Medica is a triannual peer-reviewed scientific journal covering biochemistry, clinical chemistry, and laboratory medicine. It was established in 1991 and is published by the Croatian Society of Medical Biochemistry and Laboratory Medicine. In 2006, the existing editor-in-chief and editorial board were replaced, and the new editorial board redesigned the journal's entire format; soon afterward, the journal was indexed in both EMBASE and Scopus. The journal received its first impact factor from the Journal Citation Reports in 2010, based on articles published in 2009. The editor-in-chief is Daria Pašalić (School of Medicine, University of Zagreb). According to the Journal Citation Reports, the journal has a 2017 impact factor of 3.653.

References

External links

Biochemistry journals
Laboratory medicine journals
Publications established in 1991
Creative Commons Attribution-licensed journals
Triannual journals
English-language journals
Academic journals published by learned and professional societies
Academic journals of Croatia